The following is a list of notable events and releases of the year 1949 in Norwegian music.

Events

 The Department of Traditional Music was established in Tromsø by Arnt Bakke.

Deaths

Births

 January
 18 – Håkon Banken, singer (died 2018)

 February

 March
 18 – Åse Kleveland, singer, guitarist, and politician.
 21 – Åge Aleksandersen, singer, songwriter and guitarist.

 April
 2 – Per Husby, jazz pianist, composer, and orchestra leader.

 May
 13 – Philip Kruse, trumpeter, orchestra leader, composer, music arranger, music producer, and text writer.
 25 – Iver Kleive, composer and organist.

 June
 20 – Harald Halvorsen, jazz trombonist.

 August
 3 – Torgeir Rebolledo Pedersen, architect, poet and playwright.
 12 – Alex Naumik, Lithuanian-born artist, songwriter and record producer (died 2013).

 September
 2 – Knut Borge, journalist, entertainer, and jazz enthusiast (died 2017).
 25 – Olav Berg, composer.
 30 – Lars Klevstrand, singer, guitarist, composer and actor.

 October
 18 – Lasse Thoresen, composer.

 December
 14 – Inger Lise Rypdal, singer and actress.

See also
 1949 in Norway
 Music of Norway

References

 
Norwegian music
Norwegian
Music
1940s in Norwegian music